Arunah Dunlop (December 15, 1846 – January 1, 1892) was an Ontario merchant and political figure. He represented Renfrew North in the Legislative Assembly of Ontario as a Conservative member from 1890 to 1892.

He was born in Pembroke and grew up there. In 1874, he married Mary Ellen Deacon. Dunlop sold hardware and lumber. He died in 1892.

His son Edward Arunah also served in the provincial assembly and was provincial treasurer.  Arunah's grandson, Edward Arunah Dunlop Jr. was an MPP as well from 1963 to 1971.

References

External links 
The Canadian parliamentary companion, 1891 JA Gemmill

1846 births
1892 deaths
People from Pembroke, Ontario
Progressive Conservative Party of Ontario MPPs